The 1981–82 Scottish Premier Division season was won by Celtic, two points ahead of Aberdeen. The league was won on the final day of the season 
when Celtic defeated St Mirren 3–0 at Celtic Park on 15 May 1982. Partick Thistle and Airdrieonians were relegated.

Table

Results

Matches 1–18
During matches 1–18 each team plays every other team twice (home and away).

Matches 19–36
During matches 19–36 each team plays every other team twice (home and away).

References
1981–82 Scottish Premier Division – Statto

Scottish Premier Division seasons
1
Scot